Michelle McLean (born 31 July 1972) is a Namibian actress, writer, model and beauty queen who was crowned Miss Universe 1992 at Thailand. McLean was 19 years old when she was crowned Miss Universe, and became the first Namibian woman to win the title. McLean had been crowned Miss Namibia 1991 before Miss Universe, and also placed as the fourth runner-up at Miss World 1991.

Early life
At the age of 13, Michelle McLean entered the world of International modelling, being crowned Miss Namibia in 1991 and reaching the all-time high as Miss Universe, crowned in Bangkok, Thailand, in 1992 - at the age of 19.

Personal life
Michelle married Neil Bierbaum. They had a son together, Luke McLean Bierbaum in 1999. They then divorced in 2006. 

Michelle McLean and former Manchester United goalkeeper Gary Bailey married on 9 March 2013.

Pageantry

Miss World
Before Miss Universe, McLean competed in Miss World 1991. In the preliminary competition she was tied in second place with a score of 51 along with Miss South Africa, behind the eventual winner, Venezuela's Ninibeth Leal; McLean eventually finished in the top 5.

Miss Universe
In the 1992 Miss Universe pageant she finished second in the preliminary with a score of 9.147, right behind Carolina Izsak of Venezuela, who won all three preliminary competitions. Nonetheless, McLean's warmth and love for children helped clinch the crown over Izsak, Paola Turbay of Colombia, and Madhushri Sapre of India.

Life after Miss Universe

As a master of ceremonies, Michelle McLean has worked in 26 countries, including South America and Asia. Some of her more memorable events have been the hosting of 'Opera at the Pyramids'; M-Net's 'Face of Africa' competition in Ghana and Egypt and the Loeries Advertising Awards in both 1998 and 2000.

As a TV presenter, her shows have ranged from magazine and lifestyle to music and e-commerce to show-casing some of South Africa's most stylish homes in her new DSTV Home Channel "Better Bonds Celebrity Homes". She is also one of South Africa's leading voice-over artists, with MTN Cellular as one of her main clients.

She campaigns for charities, notably The Michelle McLean Children Trust in Namibia and the Michelle McLean Primary School, also in Namibia, which has 890 students. The Michelle McLean Children's Trust in Namibia, which focuses on the education and care of under-privileged children, was founded in 1992 and has raised over 50 million dollars to help children in her native Namibia, in Southern Africa. In 2000, McLean funded the building of the Michelle McLean Primary School, in the capital of Namibia, Windhoek. It now has just under 1000 students. 

Michelle was instrumental in bringing the Miss Universe pageant to her country in 1995. 
In 2009 Michelle co-hosted the Miss World pageant held in South Africa. In 2019, McLean formed part of the selection committee of the Miss Universe 2018.

From 1993 to 1994, while living in Los Angeles, Michelle did acting with Sal Dano (Tom Selleck and Carrie Otis's coach).

After moving back to South Africa, Michelle became a presenter for Mnet, from 1995 to 2003, hosting and presenting numerous programmes. Front Row (a magazine show), E-bucks (an e-commerce show), Buy Design (a property make-over show for SABC), Celebrity Homes (showcasing their homes for DSTV), Revlon Supermodels (a reality show for SABC), and most recently, Woza Lunchtime (lifestyle show for Super Sport during the FIFA World Cup 2010).

Michelle was the face of Lux Lotion in South Africa and has been the official voice of MTN for six years. 

She is a member of the World Economic Forum and is a consultant for Trade and Tourism in Southern Africa.

In 1998, Michelle was recognized by Donald Trump—the owner of the Miss Universe Organization—and presented with The Lifetime Achievement Award for her philanthropy work.

Michelle moved from South Africa and now resides in Florida, USA.

References

1972 births
Life coaches
Living people
Miss Universe winners
Miss Universe 1992 contestants
Miss World 1991 delegates
Namibian beauty pageant winners
Namibian female models
Namibian people of British descent
People from Windhoek
White Namibian people
Namibian expatriates in South Africa
Namibian expatriates in the United States
Association footballers' wives and girlfriends